The following radio stations broadcast on the AM frequency of 570 kHz : 570 AM is a regional broadcast frequency.

Argentina 
 Radio Argentina in Buenos Aires

Brazil 
 ZYH-613 in Juaziero Norte
 ZYH-614 in Itapipoca
 ZYH-750 in Bariri
 ZYH890 in Imperatriz
 ZYJ-735 in Criciuma
 ZYJ794 in Dion Cerquei
 ZYK-595 in Itapeva
 ZYK267 in São José dos Quatro Marcos
 ZYK-672 in Taubate
 ZYK-698 in Nhandeara
 ZYK717 in Bairi
 ZYL-261 in Belo Horizonte

Canada

Chile 
 CB-057 in Santiago
 CD-057 in Base Teniente R. Marsh Martin / Base Presidente Eduardo Frei Montalva / Villa las Estrellas

Colombia 
 HJND in Bogotá
 HJC61 in Puerto Carreño

Costa Rica 
 TISBJ in San José

Cuba 
 CMEA in Santa Clara
 CMNA in Pilon

Denmark

Greenland 
 OXI in Nuuk

Dominican Republic 
 HIMS in Santo Domingo

Ecuador 
 HCRM1 in Quito

El Salvador 
 YSKT San Salvador

Guatemala 
 TGPA in Palmeras

Mexico 
 XEBJB-AM in Apodaca, Nuevo León
 XELQ-AM in Morelia, Michoacán
 XEOA-AM in Oaxaca de Juárez, Oaxaca
 XETD-AM in Tecuala, Nayarit
XEUK-AM in Caborca, Sonora
 XEVJP-AM in Xicotepec de Juárez, Puebla

Nicaragua 
 YNR3

Panama 
 HORS in Maria Henriquez

Paraguay 
 ZP 15 in Pedro Juan Caballero

Peru 
 OAX3X in Chimbote

United States

Uruguay 
 CX 57 in Treinta y Tres

Venezuela 
 YVLZ in Villa De Cura

External links

 FCC list of radio stations on 570 kHz

References

Lists of radio stations by frequency